Paolo Savoldelli (born 7 May 1973 in Clusone, province of Bergamo) is a former Italian road racing cyclist and winner of the 2002 and 2005 Giro d'Italia.

Savoldelli was a climber but known for his fast downhill riding. He is nicknamed Il Falco ("the falcon"). His downhill skills won him the 2005 Giro. His descent of the Colle delle Finestre before the final ascent to Sestriere in the penultimate stage, closed a gap to Gilberto Simoni, preserving his lead and giving him the win.

On 20 July 2005, Savoldelli won the 17th stage of the Tour de France. He led  in the 2007 Giro d'Italia, but worked for teammate Eddy Mazzoleni.

Savoldelli retired from competitive professional cycling at the end of the 2008 season. He did not leave the cycling world however, as he embarked on a career covering the sport in the media.

As of 2012, Savoldelli worked for the Italian television channel RAI, providing viewers with commentary on cycling races. He comments from a motorbike, offering insights from a first-hand point of view. He concludes each of his interventions with an emphatic "A Voi!" (Italian for "Back to you!"), which became his trademark.

Despite having already retired, in May 2014 Savoldelli was banned from bicycle racing for six months for being a client of the infamous doping doctor, Michele Ferrari. Later his name was tied to evidence in the 2012 USADA Report as "Rider 1," and he is said to have set up and used EPO doping in the 2006 Giro d'Italia.

Career achievements

Major results

1996
 10th Overall Volta a Catalunya
1997
 1st Stage 4 Hofbrau Cup
1998
 1st  Overall Giro del Trentino
1st Stage 2
 9th Overall Giro d'Italia
 10th Overall Tour de Romandie
1999
 1st  Overall Giro del Trentino
1st Stage 1
 1st Trofeo Laigueglia
 2nd Overall Giro d'Italia
1st Stage 14
 4th Overall Tour de Romandie
2000
 1st  Overall Tour de Romandie
1st Prologue
 3rd Overall Giro del Trentino
1st Stage 3
2001
 Tour de Romandie
1st Prologue & Stage 2
 4th Overall Tirreno–Adriatico
2002
 1st  Overall Giro d'Italia
 7th Overall Tirreno–Adriatico
2004
 6th Overall Tour of Britain
 9th Tre Valli Varesine
2005
 1st  Overall Giro d'Italia
1st Stage 11
 1st Stage 17 Tour de France
 9th Klasika Primavera
2006
 1st Prologue Tour de Romandie
 4th Overall Tirreno–Adriatico
 5th Overall Giro d'Italia
1st  Combination classification
1st Prologue
2007
 1st Stage 20 Giro d'Italia
 2nd Overall Tour de Romandie
1st Prologue
2008
 2nd Overall Settimana Ciclistica Lombarda

Grand Tour general classification results timeline

DNF = Did not finish

References

External links

Giro d'Italia winners
1973 births
People from Clusone
Living people
Italian male cyclists
Italian Tour de France stage winners
Italian Giro d'Italia stage winners
Cyclists from the Province of Bergamo
Doping cases in cycling
Italian sportspeople in doping cases